Jacob Wilhelm Mechau (1745-1808) was a German landscape painter, graphic artist and etcher. His style was part of the transition from Classicism to Romanticism.

Biography 
His father, Daniel Simon Mechau, was an accountant for the city council. The painter, Benjamin Calau, was a boarder at his home and inspired Jacob to pursue a career in art. First, he went to Berlin, where he took private lessons from Bernhard Rode for three years, but his primary influences came from Blaise Nicholas Le Sueur and his student, Paul Joseph Bardou, at the Prussian Academy.

In 1770, he transferred to the Dresden Academy of Fine Arts and perfected his skills with its Director, Giovanni Battista Casanova. He was able to stay there for almost four years before returning to Leipzig. There, he received orders for drawings from that city's numerous publishing houses, many of them made into engravings by Christian Gottlieb Geyser. To improve his work, he studied illustrating with Adam Friedrich Oeser.

In 1775, thanks to recommendations from the art historian and publisher, Christian Ludwig von Hagedorn, he was elected a member of the Hochschule für Grafik und Buchkunst (Academy of Graphics and Book Art).

Italian journeys
In 1776, together with his friend and former fellow student, Heinrich Friedrich Füger, he traveled to Italy, where he made his decision to focus on landscape painting; taking Claude Lorrain and Jakob Philipp Hackert as his models. He stayed there for about four years, then returned to Leipzig. He went back to Italy in 1790, after having been denied a permanent position at the Dresden Academy.

From 1792 to 1798, he created his best known series of etchings: , consisting of 72 scenes from Rome and its surroundings. Its views included Tivoli, Subiaco and Lake Albano.

The occupation of Italy by France in 1798 was the occasion for his final return home, to Dresden. He would live there for the remainder of his life, occupied mostly with painting landscapes of Saxony. His series of seven, exhibited in 1807, completed his transformation to Romanticism.

Sources 
  (Online @ Wikisource)
 
 "Jacob Wilhelm Mechau" @ Sächsische Biografie
 Anke Fröhlich: „...er folgte seinem eigenen Genius...“: dem Landschaftsmaler Jakob Wilhelm Mechau (1745 - 1808) zum 200. Geburtstag, in: Dresdener Kunstblätter, Vol.52, München 2008, 
 Christina Schwichtenberg-Winkler: Die „Collection ou suite pittoresque de l'Italie dessinées d'après nature et gravées à l'eau forte a Rome par trois peintres allemands A. C. Dies, Charles Reinhart, Jacques Mechau“, 1792 -98, 1799 : das Pittoreske und die römische Vedute um 1800, Diss., Aachen 1992

External links 

 More works by Mechau @ ArtNet
 
 "Auf dem Weg zur Romantik: Die Entdeckung der Landschaft", from the Hamburger Abendblatt, about an exhibition at the Hamburger Kunsthalle in 2006

1745 births
1808 deaths
18th-century German painters
18th-century German male artists
German landscape painters
German etchers
Prussian Academy of Arts alumni
German illustrators
Artists from Leipzig
19th-century German painters
19th-century German male artists